This is a list of notable Business Process Execution Language (BPEL) and Business Process Model and Notation (BPMN) engines.

References

See also 
 Business Process Execution Language
 Comparison of business integration software
 List of BPMN 2.0 Engines

BPEL engines
Middleware
BPEL